The 2022-23 Hong Kong First Division League is the 9th season of Hong Kong First Division since it became the second-tier football league in Hong Kong in 2014–15. The season began on 2 October 2022.

Teams

Changes from last season

From First Division

Promoted to the Hong Kong Premier League
 Sham Shui Po
 Tai Po

To First Division

Promoted from the Second Division
 Kowloon City
 Kwai Tsing

Name changes
 Metro Gallery renamed as Leaper MG

League table

League table

References

Hong Kong First Division League seasons
2022–23 in Hong Kong football